God Is Not Great (sometimes stylized as god is not Great) is a 2007 book by British-American author and journalist Christopher Hitchens, in which he makes a case against organized religion. It was originally published in the United Kingdom by Atlantic Books as God Is Not Great: The Case Against Religion and in the United States by Twelve as God Is Not Great: How Religion Poisons Everything, but was republished by Atlantic Books in 2017 with no subtitle.

Hitchens posited that organized religion is "violent, irrational, intolerant, allied to racism, tribalism, and bigotry, invested in ignorance and hostile to free inquiry, contemptuous of women and coercive toward children" and sectarian, and that accordingly it "ought to have a great deal on its conscience". He supports his position with a mixture of personal stories, documented historical anecdotes and critical analysis of religious texts. His commentary focuses mainly on the Abrahamic religions, although it also touches on other religions, such as Eastern religions. The book received mixed reviews and sold well.

Summary

Chapter One: Putting It Mildly
Hitchens writes that, at the age of nine, he began to question the teachings of his Bible instructor, and began to see critical flaws in apologetic arguments, most notably the argument from design. He discusses people who become atheists, describing some as people who have never believed, and others as those who have separately discarded religious traditions. He asserts that atheists who disagree with each other will eventually side together on whatever the evidence most strongly supports. He discusses why human beings have a tendency towards being "faithful" and argues that religion will remain entrenched in the human consciousness as long as human beings cannot overcome their primitive fears, particularly that of their own mortality. He concludes by saying that he would not want to eradicate religion if the faithful would "leave him alone", but ultimately they are incapable of this.

Chapter Two: Religion Kills
Hitchens lays out his central thesis for this chapter: religion is not content with claims about the next world and must seek to interfere with the lives of nonbelievers.

In this vein, Hitchens addresses a hypothetical question that he was asked while on a panel with radio host Dennis Prager: if he were alone in an unfamiliar city at night, and a group of strangers began to approach him, would he feel safer, or less safe, knowing that these men had just come from a prayer meeting?  Hitchens answers, 
He gives detailed descriptions of the tense social and political situations within these cities, which he personally experienced and attributes to religion.  He has thus "not found it a prudent rule to seek help as the prayer meeting breaks up".

He discusses the 1989 fatwa issued on author and friend Salman Rushdie by the Ayatollah Khomeini because of the contents of Rushdie's book The Satanic Verses. He criticises several public figures for laying the blame for the incident on Rushdie himself.  He also writes about the events following the September 11 attacks, describing how religion, particularly major religious figures, allowed matters to "deteriorate in the interval between the removal of the Taliban and the overthrow of Saddam Hussein".

Chapter Three: A Short Digression On The Pig; or, Why Heaven Hates Ham
Hitchens discusses the prohibition on eating pigs ("porcophobia" as Hitchens calls it) in Judaism, also adopted by Islam. He says that this proscription is not just Biblical or dietary. He reports that even today, Muslim zealots demand that the Three Little Pigs, Miss Piggy, Piglet from Winnie-the-Pooh and other traditional pets and characters be "removed from the innocent gaze of their children". Hitchens suggests that the pork prohibition found in Semitic religions may be based in the proscription of human sacrifice, extended to pigs because of the similarities in appearance and flavor between pork and human flesh.

Chapter Four: A Note On Health, To Which Religion May Be Hazardous
Hitchens explains how some religions can be hostile to disease treatment. He writes that many Muslims saw the polio vaccine as a conspiracy, and thus allowed polio to spread.  He discusses the Catholic Church's response to the spread of HIV in Africa, telling people that condoms are ineffective, which, he argues, contributed to the death toll. He notes with examples that some in both the Catholic and the Muslim communities believe irrationally that HIV and HPV are punishment for sexual sin—particularly homosexuality. He describes religious leaders as "faith healers", and opines that they are hostile to medicine because it undermines their position of power.

He criticises the Jewish ritual of circumcision that would have him "take a baby boy's penis in my hand, cut around the prepuce, and complete the action by taking his penis in my mouth, sucking off the foreskin, and spitting out the amputated flap along with a mouthful of blood and saliva", and denounces the traditional African practice of female genital mutilation. He concludes the chapter writing of the religious "wish for obliteration"—for a death in the form of the day of the Apocalypse.

Chapter Five: The Metaphysical Claims of Religion Are False
Hitchens begins by saying that the strong faith that could stand up to any form of reason is long gone. He compares the popular knowledge of the world in Thomas Aquinas's time to what we now know about the world. He uses the example of Laplace—"It works well enough without that [God] hypothesis"—to demonstrate that we do not need God to explain things; he claims that religion becomes obsolete as an explanation when it becomes optional or one among many different beliefs. He concludes that the leap of faith is not just one leap; it is a leap repeatedly made, and a leap that becomes more difficult to take the more it is taken: which is why so many religionists now feel the need to move beyond mere faith and cite evidence for their beliefs.

Chapter Six: Arguments From Design
Hitchens says that Abrahamic religions are used to making people feel like lowly sinners, encouraging low self-esteem, while at the same time leading them to believe that their creator genuinely cares for them, thus inflating their sense of self-importance. He says that superstition to some extent has a "natural advantage", being that it was contrived many centuries before the modern age of human reason and scientific understanding, and discusses a few examples as well as so-called miracles.

He discusses the design arguments, using examples such as the human body wearing out in old age as bad design. He writes that if evolution had taken a slightly different course, there would be no guarantee at all that organisms remotely like humans would ever have existed.

Chapter Seven: The Nightmare Of The Old Testament
Hitchens lists anachronisms and inconsistencies in the Old Testament, stating that many of the "gruesome, disordered events ... never took place".  He says the Pentateuch is "an ill-carpentered fiction, bolted into place well after the non-events that it fails to describe convincingly or even plausibly". He points out that when Moses orders parents to have their children stoned to death (see also List of capital crimes in the Torah) for indiscipline (citing Deuteronomy) it is probably a violation of at least one of the very commandments which Moses received from God. He notes that Moses "continually makes demented pronouncements ('He that is wounded in the stones, or hath his privy member cut off, shall not enter into the congregation of the Lord')."

Chapter Eight: The "New" Testament Exceeds The Evil Of The "Old" One
On the subject of a mythical Jesus and the possibility of a historical Jesus in the Gospels, a number of sources on the Internet attribute the controversial quote "Jesus is Santa Claus for adults"' to Hitchens and God Is Not Great, but those words do not appear in this chapter or this book. Hitchens does argue that the "multiple authors—none of whom published anything until many decades after the Crucifixion—cannot agree on anything of importance", "the gospels are most certainly not literal truth", and there is "little or no evidence for the life of Jesus".  To Hitchens, the best argument for the "highly questionable existence of Jesus", however, is biblical inconsistency, explaining the "very attempts to bend and stretch the story may be inverse proof that someone of later significance was indeed born".

Hitchens first connects the Book of Isaiah in the Old Testament with its prediction that "a virgin shall conceive, and bear a son" (see Isaiah 7:14), pointing out where the stories converge, Old Testament to New. Comparing the Testaments, he considers the New Testament "also a work of crude carpentry, hammered together long after its purported events, and full of improvised attempts to make things come out right". He points out that, while H. L. Mencken considered some of the New Testament events to be historically verifiable, Mencken maintained that "most of them ... show unmistakable signs of having been tampered with".

Hitchens also outlines the inaccuracy in Luke's attempt to triangulate three world events of the time with Jesus's birth: the census ordered by Augustus of the entire Roman world, the reign of King Herod in Judea and that of Quirinius as governor of Syria (see the Census of Quirinius). He says that there is no record by any Roman historian of any Augustan census, and that, although "the Jewish chronicler Josephus mentions one that did occur—without the onerous requirement for people to return to their places of birth", it was undertaken "six years after the birth of Jesus is supposed to have taken place". He also notes that Herod died in 4 BC, and that Quirinius was not governor of Syria during his tenure.

Hitchens refers to The Passion of the Christ as "a soap-opera film about the death of Jesus ... produced by an Australian fascist and ham actor named Mel Gibson", who "adheres to a crackpot and schismatic Catholic sect". In Hitchens's view, the film attempts tirelessly to blame the death of Jesus on the Jews. He claims that Gibson did not realize that the four Gospels were not at all historical records, and that they had multiple authors, all being written many decades after the crucifixion—and, moreover, that they do not agree on anything "of importance" (e.g., the virgin birth and the genealogy of Jesus). He cites many contradictions of this type.

He further contends that the many "contradictions and illiteracies" of the New Testament, while extensively covered by other authors, have never been explained except as "metaphor" and "a Christ of faith". He states that the "feebleness" of the Bible is a result of the fact that until recently, Christians faced with arguments against the logic or factualness of the Bible "could simply burn or silence anybody who asked any inconvenient questions".

Hitchens points out the problematic implications of the scriptural proclamation "he that is without sin among you, let him cast a first stone" with regard to the practical legislation of retributive justice: "if only the non-sinners have the right to punish, then how could an imperfect society ever determine how to prosecute offenders?" Of the adulterous woman whom Jesus saved from stoning, the author contends that Jesus thus forgives her of sheer sexual promiscuity, and, if this be the case, that the lesson has ever since been completely misunderstood. Closing the chapter, he suggests that advocates of religion have faith alone to rely on—nothing else—and calls on them to "be brave enough" to admit it.

Chapter Nine: The Koran Is Borrowed From Both Jewish and Christian Myths
Chapter nine assesses the religion of Islam, and examines the origin of its holy book, the Quran. Hitchens asserts that there is no evidence for any of the "miraculous" claims about Muhammad, and that the Koran's origin was not supernatural. He contends that the religion was fabricated by Muhammad or his followers and that it was borrowed from other religious texts, and the hadith was taken from common maxims and sayings which developed throughout Arabia and Persia at the time. He identifies similarities between Islam and Christianity, and notes several plagiarisms of the Jewish faith.

Chapter Ten: The Tawdriness Of The Miraculous And The Decline Of Hell
Chapter ten discusses miracles. Hitchens says that no supernatural miracles occur, nor have occurred in history. He says that evidence of miracles is fabricated, or based on the unreliable testimony of people who are mistaken or biased. He notes that no verifiable miracle has been documented since cameras have become commonplace. Hitchens uses a specific purported miracle by Mother Teresa to show how miracles can become perceived as true, when in fact they are based on myth or falsehood.

Chapter Eleven: Religion's Corrupt Beginnings
Chapter eleven discusses how religions form, and claims that most religions are founded by corrupt, immoral individuals. The chapter specifically discusses cargo cults, Pentecostal minister Marjoe Gortner, and Mormonism. Hitchens discusses Joseph Smith, the founder of Mormonism, citing a March 1826 Bainbridge, New York court examination accusing him of being a "disorderly person and impostor" who Hitchens claims admitted there that he had supernatural powers and was "defrauding citizens". Four years later Smith claimed to obtain gold tablets containing the Book of Mormon. When the neighbor's skeptical wife buried 116 pages of the translation and challenged Smith to reproduce it, Smith claimed God, knowing this would happen, told him to instead translate a different section of the same plates.

Chapter Twelve: A Coda: How Religions End
Chapter twelve discusses the termination of several religions, to illustrate that some religions are not everlasting, as they claim. The religions addressed include Millerism and Sabbatai Sevi.

Chapter Thirteen: Does Religion Make People Behave Better?
Hitchens addresses the question of whether religious people behave more virtuously than non-religious people (atheists, agnostics, or freethinkers). He uses the battle against slavery in the United States, and Abraham Lincoln, to support his claim that non-religious people battle for moral causes with as much vigor and effect as religious advocates.

Chapter Fourteen: There Is No "Eastern" Solution
Hitchens dismisses the idea of seeking enlightenment through nirvana as a conceit that asks adherents to "put their reason to sleep, and to discard their minds along with their sandals" in chapter fourteen, which focuses on maladaptive and immiserating Hindu and Buddhist feudalism and violence in Tibet and Sri Lanka. It touches on the lucrative careers of Chandra Mohan Jain and Sathyanarayana Raju, and details his observations of a "brisk fleecing" and the unstable devotees witnessed during the author's staged pilgrimage to an ashram in Pune, which was undertaken as part of a BBC documentary. He suggests that the BBC has no longer a "standard of fairness". He suggests that image of "imperial-way buddhism" is not that of the original Gautama Buddha, and looks at the Japanese Buddhists who joined the Axis forces in World War II.

Hitchens seeks to answer the question "How might one easily prove that 'Eastern' faith was identical with the unverifiable assumptions of 'Western' religion?" He concludes:

Chapter Fifteen: Religion As An Original Sin
Chapter 15 discusses five aspects of religions that Hitchens maintains are "positively immoral":
 Presenting a false picture of the world to the credulous
 The doctrine of blood sacrifice to appease gods (such as by the Aztecs)
 The doctrine of atonement (harming innocent people to atone for sins)
 The doctrine of eternal reward or eternal punishment
 The imposition of impossible tasks or rules (including unhealthy views of sexuality)

Chapter Sixteen: Is Religion Child Abuse?
Hitchens discusses how religion has been used to cause harm to children. He cites examples such as genital mutilation or circumcision, and imposition of fear of healthy sexual activities such as masturbation. He criticizes the way that adults use religion to terrorize children.

Chapter Seventeen: An Objection Anticipated
Chapter seventeen addresses the most common counter-argument that Hitchens says he hears, namely that the most immoral acts in human history were performed by atheists like Joseph Stalin. He says "it is interesting that people of faith now seek defensively to say they are no worse than fascists or Nazis or Stalinists". Hitchens began his rebuttal by tracing the understanding of the Nazis or Stalinists, to the concept of totalitarianism probably first used by Victor Serge and then popularized by Hannah Arendt. He appreciates the difference between totalitarianism and despotism, with the former being absolutist systems that demand total surrender of the private lives and personalities of their subjects. On this definition of totalitarianism, Hitchens finds the totalitarian principle laden in many non-secular states and regimes.

He analyzes those examples of immorality, and shows that although the individual leaders may have been atheist or agnostic, that religion played a key role in these events, and religious people and religious leaders fully participated in the wars and crimes.

Chapter Eighteen: A Finer Tradition: The Resistance Of The Rational
Chapter eighteen discusses several important intellectuals, including Socrates, Albert Einstein, Voltaire, Spinoza, Thomas Paine, Charles Darwin, and Isaac Newton. Hitchens claims that many of these people were atheists, agnostics, or pantheists, except for Socrates and Newton. He says that religious advocates have attempted to misrepresent some of these icons as religious, and describes how some of these individuals fought against the negative influences of religion.

Chapter Nineteen: In Conclusion: The Need for a New Enlightenment
Hitchens argues that the human race no longer needs religion to the extent it has in the past. He says the time has come for science and reason to take a more prominent role in the life of individuals and larger cultures; that de-emphasizing religion will improve the quality of life of individuals, and assist the progress of civilization. It is in effect a rallying call to atheists to fight the theocratic encroachment on free society.

Critical reception

Positive critique
Michael Kinsley, in The New York Times Book Review, lauded Hitchens's "logical flourishes and conundrums, many of them entertaining to the nonbeliever". He concluded that "Hitchens has outfoxed the Hitchens watchers by writing a serious and deeply felt book, totally consistent with his beliefs of a lifetime".

Bruce DeSilva considered the book to be the best piece of atheist writing since Bertrand Russell's Why I Am Not a Christian (1927), with Hitchens using "elegant yet biting prose". He concludes that "Hitchens has nothing new to say, although it must be acknowledged that he says it exceptionally well".

The book was praised in Kirkus Reviews as a "pleasingly intemperate assault on organized religion" that "like-minded readers will enjoy".

In The Sydney Morning Herald, Matt Buchanan dubbed it "a thundering 300-page cannonade; a thrillingly fearless, impressively wide-ranging, thoroughly bilious and angry book against the idea of God"; Buchanan found the work to be "easily the most impressive of the present crop of atheistic and anti-theistic books: clever, broad, witty and brilliantly argued".

Jason Cowley in the Financial Times called the book "elegant but derivative".

Negative critique
David Bentley Hart, reviewing the book in the Christian journal First Things, interpreted the book as a "rollicking burlesque, without so much as a pretense of logical order or scholarly rigor". Hart says "On matters of simple historical and textual fact, moreover, Hitchens' book is so extraordinarily crowded with errors that one soon gives up counting them." Hart claims that Hitchens conflates the histories of the 1st and 4th crusades, restates the discredited assertion that the early church destroyed ancient pagan texts, and asserts that Myles Coverdale and John Wycliffe were burned alive when both men died of old age.

Stephen Prothero of The Washington Post considered Hitchens correct on many points but found the book "maddeningly dogmatic" and criticized Hitchens's condemnation of religion altogether, writing that "If this is religion, then by all means we should have less of it. But the only people who believe that religion is about believing blindly in a God who blesses and curses on demand and sees science and reason as spawns of Satan are unlettered fundamentalists and their atheistic doppelgangers."

Responding to Hitchens's claim that "all attempts to reconcile faith with science and reason are consigned to failure and ridicule", Peter Berkowitz of the Hoover Institution quotes paleontologist Stephen Jay Gould. Referencing a number of scientists with religious faith, Gould wrote, "Either half my colleagues are enormously stupid, or else the science of Darwinism is fully compatible with conventional religious beliefs—and equally compatible with atheism."

William J. Hamblin of the FARMS Review criticized Hitchens for implying unanimity among biblical scholars on controversial points and overlooking alternative scholarly positions, and felt that Hitchens's understanding of biblical studies was "flawed at best." "[F]or Hitchens, it is sufficient to dismiss the most extreme, literalistic, and inerrantist interpretations of the Bible to demonstrate not only that the Bible itself is thoroughly flawed, false, and poisonous but that God does not exist." Hamblin felt that he misrepresented the Bible "at the level of a confused undergraduate", failing to contextualise it. Hamblin concluded that the book "should certainly not be seen as reasonable grounds for rejecting belief in God".

Daniel C. Peterson attacked the accuracy of Hitchens's claims in a lengthy essay, describing it as "crammed to the bursting point with errors, and the striking thing about this is that the errors are always, always, in Hitchens’s favor. [...] In many cases, Hitchens is 180 degrees wrong. He is so far wrong that, if he moved at all, he would be coming back toward right."

Curtis White criticized the book as "intellectually shameful" due to its alleged lack of intellectual rigor. White, an atheist critic of religion, asserts that "one enormous problem with Hitchens’s book is that it reduces religion to a series of criminal anecdotes. In the process, however, virtually all of the real history of religious thought, as well as historical and textual scholarship, is simply ignored as if it never existed."

Sales history
The book was published on May 1, 2007, and within a week had reached No. 2 on the Amazon bestsellers list (behind Harry Potter and the Deathly Hallows), and reached No. 1 on the New York Times Bestseller list in its third week.

Notes

References
 .
 .

External links

FARMS Review of God is Not Great - FARMS
Exclusive Excerpts from God Is Not Great - Slate

2007 non-fiction books
American non-fiction books
Antitheism
Books about atheism
Books by Christopher Hitchens
Books critical of Christianity
Books critical of Islam
Books critical of Judaism
Books critical of religion
English-language books
New Atheism
Atlantic Books books
Twelve (publisher) books